, also known as TUF, is a television network headquartered in Fukushima Prefecture, Japan.

History 
TUF is the fourth commercial television broadcaster in Fukushima Prefecture, it was started broadcasting in 1983. TUF is affiliated with JNN,   TBS Holdings is the biggest sharehloder of TUF. 

On June 1 2006, TUF started broadcasting digital terrestrial television. Due to the 2011 Tōhoku earthquake and tsunami, TUF postpone its schedule to end analogue television broadcasting on March 31 2012.

References

External links
 Official website 

Companies based in Fukushima Prefecture
Television stations in Japan
Japan News Network
Television channels and stations established in 1983